Bangerz is the fourth studio album by American singer Miley Cyrus. It was released on September 30, 2013, by RCA Records. It is her first studio album since Can't Be Tamed (2010). Opting to re-establish her musical career instead of focusing on her acting career as originally planned, Cyrus began planning the project in mid 2012. Work continued into 2013 when she signed with RCA Records. Described by Cyrus as "dirty south hip-hop", Bangerz represents a musical departure from her previous work, which she had grown to feel "disconnected" from. As executive producers, Cyrus and Mike Will Made It collaborated with hip hop producers including Pharrell Williams, Oren Yoel, Rami Samir Afuni, Dr. Luke, and Michael McHenry. Their efforts resulted in a primarily pop and R&B record, with lyrical themes that revolve largely around romance. It features guest vocals from several new partners, including pop singer Britney Spears and rappers Big Sean, French Montana, Future, Ludacris, and Nelly. Cyrus co-wrote twelve out of sixteen tracks.

Upon its release, Bangerz received generally positive reviews from music critics, who praised its overall production and originality, as well as the evolution of Cyrus' public persona. The album debuted atop the US Billboard 200 with first-week sales of 270,000 copies. In doing so, it became Cyrus' fifth number-one album, including earlier soundtracks in which she performed as her character Hannah Montana. It was the third-highest opening week for a female artist in 2013 behind Beyoncé's self-titled album and Katy Perry's Prism, and was later certified triple-platinum by the Recording Industry Association of America (RIAA) after moving three million album-equivalent units. The album was nominated for Best Pop Vocal Album at the 57th Annual Grammy Awards, marking Cyrus' first career Grammy nomination.

"We Can't Stop" was released as the lead single from Bangerz on June 3, 2013, and peaked at number two on the US Billboard Hot 100. The second single "Wrecking Ball" was released on August 25, 2013, and became Cyrus' first number-one single in the United States. Its accompanying music video was the fastest video to reach 100 million views on Vevo until being beaten by Adele's "Hello" music video in 2015. The "Wrecking Ball" music video also won Cyrus the award for "Video of the Year" at the 2014 MTV Video Music Awards. "Adore You" was released as the third single from the record on December 17, 2013, and was certified 2× Platinum in the US. Promotional efforts for Bangerz continued to associate Cyrus with an increasingly provocative image, an effort first begun with her third record, Can't Be Tamed (2010). She garnered widespread media attention through a controversial performance at the 2013 MTV Video Music Awards, and was later the host and musical guest on an episode of Saturday Night Live. Cyrus further promoted the album with her fourth concert tour, the Bangerz Tour.

Background and production

In 2012, Cyrus announced plans to focus on her film career, effectively putting her musical endeavors on a hiatus. That year, she appeared in the films LOL and So Undercover. She was also confirmed as a primary voice actress in the feature film Hotel Transylvania, but was fired from the project due to a scandal involving her licking a suggestive cake. This fallout ended up serving her well to coordinate a musical comeback. In January 2013, Cyrus signed a recording contract with RCA Records. In March, she confirmed that her fourth studio album would be released by the end of 2013. Cyrus stated that she "started over" as an artist after terminating the services of her previous professional connections, who she felt "would have [been] scared" by her evolving public image. In a later interview, she elaborated that she recognizes Bangerz to be her official debut record, deprecating her earlier projects released during the production of Hannah Montana. While recording the then-untitled album, Cyrus intended to produce a "very adult and sexy and believable" final product, and was "having fun making music [for] the first time in her career." She said the album was influenced by Motown Sound. Musical acts which inspired the album included OneRepublic and Timbaland.

She described the music as "dirty south hip-hop" and combining the genres of hip-hop and country, which she felt was a "good hybrid". To achieve this sound, Cyrus worked with various hip hop producers including Mike Will Made It, Mac Miller, Pharrell Williams, and Tyler, the Creator in cities including Atlanta, Georgia. They helped her to incorporate hip hop music elements into the project, which Cyrus acknowledged resulted in a "really different sound". Cyrus further commented that her project would "shut everyone up", and later compared the record to Bad (1987) by Michael Jackson, in that "people still are listening to [it] because it's so fucking dope" and "[wants] people to listen to [her] album like that." She also expressed her desire to "set a new standard for pop music". Producer Sean Garrett called the record "fun [and] exciting", and stated that a collaboration that Cyrus recorded with Britney Spears would appear on the final track listing. Mike Will Made It explained that the title for the album was decided upon after realizing that "whole album was bangers".

Release and artwork

On August 6, 2013, after reaching 13 million followers on Twitter, Cyrus tweeted that the record would be titled Bangerz. Its cover sleeve and images were shot by British photographer Tyrone Lebon; several unused pictures from the photo shoot surfaced online on June 5, 2014. On August 24, 2013, Cyrus unveiled the album artworks for the standard and deluxe versions of the album; both depict a blonde Cyrus wearing a short black coat with the title "Bangerz" stylized in fluorescent neon lighting in front of palm trees. It was described as being reminiscent of the 1980s television series Miami Vice and an unexpected choice given her recent influence by hip hop culture. Later on August 25, Bangerz was made available for pre-order through the iTunes Store. She later confirmed that it would be released on October 4, 2013, in the United States. After her music video for the track "Wrecking Ball" broke the Vevo record for the most views in the first twenty-four hours of its release, Cyrus revealed the track listing for Bangerz through Twitter on September 10.

On September 18, 2013, Cyrus unveiled four additional covers for the physical version of the deluxe record, which were sporadically distributed across international retailers and voted on by fans to determine the official cover to be printed for future pressings. Two of the covers display Cyrus dressed in alternate outfits, one with a black jacket and another with a white bra and checkered black pants. The third version depicts a close-up of Cyrus surrounded by roses, while the fourth version highlights a topless Cyrus covering her chest. The topless cover is featured for an online-exclusive edition of the record and is also the primary visual for the vinyl pressings, released on November 26 through Cyrus' online store. It was compared to her music video for "Wrecking Ball", which also showcased an unclothed Cyrus, while the others were deemed conservative by comparison. A page of stickers is packaged with the deluxe version of the album. On October 15, it was announced through Cyrus' Facebook profile that the original deluxe artwork would remain the official cover. The record is additionally marked with the Parental Advisory label, affixed by the Recording Industry Association of America (RIAA) to identify explicit content. On September 29, 30-second snippets of each track on Bangerz were made available through AllMusic. The following day, the full record was made available for streaming through the iTunes Store and iTunes Radio. On April 22, 2017, the album was rereleased on vinyl for Record Store Day.

Composition

Music and lyrics
Bangerz is primarily a pop and R&B record, which also integrates elements of hip hop, synth-pop and country music. During an interview on The Ellen DeGeneres Show on October 10, host Ellen DeGeneres asked Cyrus if the record was inspired by her relationship with Liam Hemsworth, to which she replied "the whole album is a story of that and I think it says that starting with "Adore You" and ending with "Someone Else" ..... I think I knew more intuitively where my life was going than I actually thought I did at the time."

Songs and lyrical content
The record opens with  "Adore You", a pop and R&B ballad, which lyrically addresses a lover through lyrics including "We were meant to be/In holy matrimony". Nick Catucci from Entertainment Weekly opined that the track allowed Cyrus to showcase her vocal abilities. "We Can't Stop" is a midtempo pop, and R&B with influences from EDM and hip hop song that lyrically discusses the events of a house party. Mikael Wood of the Los Angeles Times calling the song "the calmest, most clear-eyed rebel yell since Janet Jackson's 'Control'." Catucci described "SMS (Bangerz)" as a "merry rap-off" with pop singer Britney Spears, who appears as a guest vocalist in the second verse. "4x4" features hip hop recording artist Nelly, and lyrically discusses the story of a "female rebel" looking to find bail for her romantic partner. Subtle country music elements are present throughout the song. "My Darlin'" features Future; Cyrus' vocal abilities were complimented, though were deemed to be overpowered by a "sea of blinking synths and unthawed crooning". "Wrecking Ball" is a synthpop ballad speaking of a failed relationship.

The seventh track "Love Money Party" features Big Sean, and incorporates a "grimy, haunted-house beat". Jason Lipshutz from Billboard noted that Cyrus appeared more comfortable with rapping in the recording, compared to an earlier performance on the Mike Will Made It single "23". "#GetItRight" is a "stylish breeze" that sees the inclusion of "whistling [...] and a chopped guitar lick". It was described as being reminiscent of "Twisted" by Usher and "Kickin' In" by Adam Lambert, all three of which were produced by Pharrell Williams. Cyrus stated that "Drive" was inspired by "needing to leave someone but not really wanting to completely cut yourself off from the relationship." The track was described as "a sad-Kanye-esque track" and her comments were assumed to reference her engagement to Hemsworth by the media. The tenth track "FU" features French Montana, and according to Catucci, blends "starry Adele-style sass and a French Montana verse into expertly inlaid dubstep wub-wubs". He went on to describe "Do My Thang" as a "ripping dance track", while Lipshutz recognized influences from "gooey synthesizers and snapping percussion". "Maybe You're Right" incorporates drum instrumentation with "hints of gospel influence", and was also questioned to be addressing Hemsworth. The thirteenth and final track "Someone Else" combines hip hop and synthpop styles, and lyrically discusses Cyrus' evolving public image.

Singles

"We Can't Stop" was released as the lead single from Bangerz on June 3, 2013. It received generally mixed reviews from music critics, who were ambivalent towards its production and lyrics. The song peaked at number 2 on the US Billboard Hot 100, tying it with "Party in the U.S.A." as Cyrus' highest-peaking single in the country at the time. Internationally, it enjoyed varying success across Europe and Oceania, and peaked at number one in New Zealand. The accompanying music video was released on June 19, 2013, and was noted for depicting an increasingly provocative Cyrus, an effort begun with her third record Can't Be Tamed (2010). With 10.7 million views in its first day, the clip briefly held the Vevo record for the most views in 24 hours, before being surpassed by "Best Song Ever" by One Direction. It was also the fastest video to reach 100 million views, having done so in 37 days.

"Wrecking Ball" was released as the album's second single on August 25, 2013. The song peaked atop the Billboard Hot 100, becoming Cyrus' first single to do so in the United States. It additionally peaked within the top-twenty of several international singles charts, and reached at number 2 in Australia and New Zealand. The accompanying music video was released on September 9, 2013, and garnered significant media attention for showcasing a nude Cyrus. With 19.3 million views, it broke the Vevo record for the most views in 24 hours, and additionally became the fastest video to reach 100 million views, having done so in 6 days. The first-day viewing record was later surpassed by the visuals for "Anaconda" by Nicki Minaj in August 2014, which received 19.6 million views, upon its premiere. On December 4, 2013, "Wrecking Ball" returned to the peak position of the Billboard Hot 100 with assistance from online streaming of a viral Chatroulette parody video, and consequently became the largest gap between number-one sittings in Billboard history. On the same month, the music videos for "Wrecking Ball" and "We Can't Stop" were announced as the first and second most-viewed videos on Vevo in 2013, respectively.

"Adore You" was released as the third and final single from Bangerz; it was serviced to contemporary hit radio stations on December 17, 2013. It received generally favorable reviews, with critics appreciating its mid-tempo production, although they criticized the use of Auto-Tune in its vocals. The accompanying music video was leaked on the evening of December 25, and was officially premiered on the morning of December 26. The clip depicts Cyrus suggestively posing in a bed and a bathtub, and is interspersed with night vision footage that appears to simulate a sex tape. Prior to being officially released as a single, the song debuted at number 42 on the Billboard Hot 100; it peaked at number 21. The remix for "Adore You", was produced by Cedric Gervais, and premiered online on February 13, 2014; it was officially released on Beatport through his label Spinnin' Records on March 3.

Promotion

Cyrus first performed "We Can't Stop" on Jimmy Kimmel Live! on June 26, 2013, and on Good Morning America the following day. In August 2013, she became the subject of widespread media attention and public scrutiny following a controversial performance and duet with Robin Thicke at the 2013 MTV Video Music Awards at Barclays Center in New York City. The performance began with Cyrus performing "We Can't Stop" in bear-themed attire. Halfway through the act, Cyrus stripped down to a skin-colored two-piece outfit as Thicke joined her on state to perform "Blurred Lines". Cyrus subsequently touched Thicke's crotch area with a giant foam finger and twerked against his crotch. An article published in The Hollywood Reporter described the performance as "crass" and "reminiscent of a bad acid trip". Media attention of the performance largely overshadowed the attention that was given to other major events of the night, such as the reunion of NSYNC and performances by Lady Gaga and Katy Perry. The performance was described by XXL critic B. J. Steiner as a "trainwreck in the classic sense of the word as the audience reaction seemed to be a mix of confusion, dismay and horror in a cocktail of embarrassment", while the BBC said Cyrus stole the show with a "raunchy performance". The performance generated 306,100 tweets per minute on Twitter, breaking the record for the most tweeted-about event in the history of the social network; the previous record, held by the Super Bowl XLVII halftime show featuring Beyoncé, generated 268,000 tweets per minute. According to Forbes, Cyrus' performance resulted in a gain of over 213,000 Twitter followers, 226,000 likes on Facebook, and 90,000 downloads of her new promotional single, "Wrecking Ball", within days of the controversial performance. This amounted to a total 112% increase in Cyrus' social media activity.

In September 2013, Cyrus sang "We Can't Stop" on Schlag den Raab in Germany (September 7), Le Grand Journal in France (September 9), and Alan Carr: Chatty Man in England (September 13). On September 21, she performed twice at iHeartRadio Music Festival in Las Vegas, in the afternoon at festival village and in the evening at MGM Grand Garden Arena. During both shows she sang "We Can't Stop" and, for the first time, "Wrecking Ball". Despite generating media attention for a provocative wardrobe, the performance was considered to be "fairly tame considering the VMAs." On October 5, Cyrus served as the host and musical guest during an episode of Saturday Night Live. She appeared in several sketches, including a parody of "We Can't Stop" titled "We Did Stop (The Government)", referencing the federal government shutdown, and performed an acoustic version of "We Can't Stop" and "Wrecking Ball". The following Monday, Cyrus performed both singles on Today as part of their Toyota Concert Series. She held an album signing on October 8 at Planet Hollywood in Times Square, and also appeared on Late Night with Jimmy Fallon and The Ellen DeGeneres Show later that month, also singing both singles there.

Bangerz was additionally promoted through the documentary Miley: The Movement, which premiered through MTV on October 2; it covered the production of the project and the lead-up to its release. In November, Cyrus traveled to Europe again to sing both "We Can't Stop" and "Wrecking Ball" at the 2013 MTV Europe Music Awards in Amsterdam on November 10; she garnered media attention for smoking a joint of marijuana on-stage while accepting the Best Video Award for the latter single. During her trip, she also performed "Wrecking Ball" on Wetten, dass..? in Germany (November 9), BBC Radio 1's Live Lounge in London (November 12), and the 2013 Bambi Awards in Germany (November 14). On November 17, she performed "Wrecking Ball" on The X Factor in London. After being criticized for delivering a lackluster vocal performance, Cyrus was placed under "vocal rest" by her doctors in preparation of the Bangerz Tour. On November 24, Cyrus performed "Wrecking Ball" at the 2013 American Music Awards; a digitally animated cat projected on the screen behind her lip-synced the lyrics alongside Cyrus. In December, she performed at Jingle Ball concerts in Los Angeles (KIIS-FM Jingle Ball), Saint Paul, Atlanta, New York City, Washington, D.C., Tampa and Sunrise. She was expected to perform in Boston during the series, although her flight from New York City was cancelled due to Winter Storm Electra and was therefore unable to attend.

Cyrus also performed "#GetItRight" and "Wrecking Ball" on Dick Clark's New Year's Rockin' Eve with Ryan Seacrest in Times Square on December 31; she had previously been expected to perform at the Fontainebleau Miami Beach with Pharrell Williams. On January 25, 2014, Cyrus sang "#GetItRight" during Clive Davis' party the evening before the 56th Annual Grammy Awards; after an unenthusiastic response from the audience, she performed a cover version of "Jolene" by Dolly Parton which received a more favorable reception. An episode of MTV Unplugged starring Cyrus premiered through MTV on January 29. She performed acoustic versions of "Adore You", "SMS (Bangerz)", "4x4", "Wrecking Ball", "#GetItRight", "Drive", "Do My Thang", and "Rooting for My Baby". Cyrus also performed a cover version of "Jolene", while Madonna appeared as a surprise guest that evening to sing a medley of Cyrus "We Can't Stop" and her own "Don't Tell Me". An uncensored version of the special was released online on February 6, and included an additional cover version of "Why'd You Only Call Me When You're High?" by the Arctic Monkeys. Cyrus performed "Wrecking Ball" during the 2014 World Music Awards in Monte-Carlo on May 27. Cyrus participated in the Summertime Ball at Wembley Stadium in London on June 21, where she sang "SMS (Bangerz)", "4x4", "Love Money Party", "Wrecking Ball", "We Can't Stop" and "Party In The USA".

Tour

During her appearance on Today on October 7, Cyrus first mentioned her intentions to tour in 2014. On October 26, she made a surprise appearance on another episode of Saturday Night Live to officially announce the Bangerz Tour. It was promoted by the American entertainment company Live Nation Entertainment, which was reported to be paying Cyrus $500,000 per presentation. The first leg of the tour visited North America and was originally scheduled to include thirty-eight shows, for which Swedish duo Icona Pop and American recording artist Sky Ferreira were announced as its opening acts.

Tickets for the North American leg became available for purchase on November 16; it began at the Rogers Arena in Vancouver on February 14, 2014, and was originally planned conclude on April 24 at the Nassau Veterans Memorial Coliseum in Uniondale, New York. However, several showings were postponed after Cyrus experienced an allergic reaction to medication on April 15. The rescheduled North American dates saw the inclusion of two additional performances; they began on August 1 at the Nassau Veterans Memorial Coliseum in Uniondale, and concluded on August 14 at the United Center in Chicago. The second leg of the tour visited Europe and included eighteen shows, for which tickets became available for purchase on December 13. It began on May 6 at The O2 Arena in London, and concluded on June 22 at the Ziggo Dome in Amsterdam. The two-hour television special Miley Cyrus: Bangerz Tour was filmed during Cyrus' performances in Spain and Portugal, and was broadcast on July 6 on NBC in the United States. The tour resumed on August 1 at Nassau Coliseum in Uniondale and concluded on October 23 at the Perth Arena in Perth, Australia.

Critical reception

Bangerz received generally positive reviews from music critics. At Metacritic, which assigns a normalized rating out of 100 to reviews from mainstream critics, the album received an average score of 61, which indicates "generally favorable reviews", based on 21 reviews. Writing for AllMusic, Heather Phares provided a favorable review, opining that it "accomplishes [the] mission" of "[selling] Cyrus as an independent woman", further commenting that the incorporation of several genres within the project "introduces Miley as an A-list pop star." Jason Lipshutz of Billboard complimented the album for being "fiercely individual", but stated that the "dramatic breakup songs" became repetitive. Lipshutz stated that the album is "neither the best nor worst pop album" released in 2013, and stated power ballad songs like "Wrecking Ball" would increase her career longevity. Nick Catucci of Entertainment Weekly described Bangerz as being "utterly fresh" and a "pop blitz from a hip hop blue print", and stated that Cyrus had visibly transitioned from her former persona established by the Disney Channel.

Mikael Wood from the Los Angeles Times noted that the album favored a "grittier, hip-hop-inspired vibe" instead of the "glossy electro-pop" from her previous material, and further opined that "We Can't Stop" "still astounds; it might be the calmest, most clear-eyed rebel yell since Janet Jackson's 'Control.' An album beyond its years." Rolling Stones Jon Dolan complimented the album's "wide-ranging production", labeling it a "Rihanna-meets-Gaga-meets-Pink-meets-Britney party grenade of a record". Writing for Fact, Tom Lea provided a more mixed review of Bangerz, calling it a "hot mess of country, Southern hip-hop and more", but concluded that the record contained "more—ahem—bangers than clangers." Caroline Sullivan from The Guardian shared a similar sentiment, but also concluded that the overall record held "more hits than misses". John Murphy of musicOMH described the tracks as being "rather run of the mill material", but nonetheless complimented Cyrus' promotional efforts for making the record "one of the most anticipated pop albums of the year". Caitlin White from Consequence of Sound praised the album saying that "though gawky and unwieldy, this is a portrait of a woman with fierce, interesting instincts".

Kitty Empire from The Observer was more negative of Bangerz, stating that the project "feels stitched together in the dark, and the attention-seeking begins to grate." Elysa Gardner for USA Today described the record's composition as "mediocre" and consisting of "competent, mostly generic tunes". Jessica Hopper from Spin was also more negative of the record, remarking that it is a "precise album that flits between bombastic and turgid" and "is very fun".

Accolades
On his list of the ten best albums of 2013, Nick Catucci from Entertainment Weekly placed Bangerz third, complimenting Cyrus' ability for "cutting-edge rap [...], a soulful voice capable of showstoppers [...], and an underappreciated emotional directness". The Guardian ranked Bangerz thirty-fourth on their list of the forty best albums, commenting that it "[winds] people up for commercial, rather than transgressive, ends" despite initially commenting that "the attention-seeking begins to grate". Rolling Stone placed Bangerz at number twenty-seven on their list of the fifty best albums, writing that Cyrus "[brought] depth and vulnerability to one hell of a party [...] amid all the foam-finger hub-hub". Ann Powers from NPR ranked the record tenth on her list of ten records, suggesting that it "should earn her entry into every celebration of pop this year", while the Associated Press ranked it ninth for being "banging". Joey Guerra from Houston Chronicle listed Bangerz as the fourth-best record of the year, calling it a "fun, feisty pop album that produced two of the year's biggest, best singles" and summarizing that "with one flick of her tongue, Cyrus easily outdoes recent fare from Gaga, Katy and Britney." FACT Magazine ranked Bangerz forty-ninth on their list of the fifty best albums of 2013, stating that "in a year where few albums from pop music’s big names lived up to potential (step forward Gaga, Britney and Jay-Z), Miley Cyrus undoubtedly ruled the roost".

Billboard listed Bangerz at number ninety-one on their list of the 100 best albums of the 2010s pointing that "with this pivotal album release, Cyrus took control of her public persona, surprising less with her provocative antics than with her constant artistic evolution." Consequence of Sound ranked Bangerz twentieth on their list of the 25 best pop albums of the 2010s.

Awards

Year-end lists

Decade-end lists

Commercial performance
In the United States on the issue dated October 16, Bangerz debuted at number one on the Billboard 200, with first-week sales of 270,000 copies. In doing so, Cyrus attained her fifth non-consecutive number-one album in the country. The figure includes her first and second studio albums Meet Miley Cyrus (2007) and Breakout (2008), in addition to the soundtracks Hannah Montana (2006) and Hannah Montana: The Movie (2009), in which Cyrus was credited as her former titular character Hannah Montana. Furthermore, the record sold 168,000 more copies than her previous effort Can't Be Tamed (2010), and became the best-selling debut week for a female artist in 2013 at that point. Three weeks later, this feat was surpassed by Katy Perry after her fourth studio album Prism (2013) debuted at number one with first-week sales of 286,000 copies. In December, both women were surpassed by Beyoncé after her fifth studio album Beyoncé (2013) was unexpectedly released on the iTunes Store and debuted at number one on the Billboard 200 with three-day sales of 617,000 copies. During its second week of release, Bangerz dropped to number two with sales of 72,000 copies, and dropped to number four in its third week after moving 53,000 units. As of February 2014, Bangerz has sold one million copies in the United States, and has been certified platinum by the Recording Industry Association of America (RIAA). On June 20, 2018, the album was certified 3× Platinum by the RIAA denoting 3 million album-equivalent units. It also debuted at number one on the Canadian Albums Chart, where it was eventually certified double platinum, and entered the Top 100 Mexico chart at number three.

Bangerz charted moderately throughout Europe. In the United Kingdom, the record and her track "Wrecking Ball" both debuted at number one on their respective charts in the same week, making Cyrus the first artist of 2013 to achieve a "chart double" in the country. The album was later recognized with a silver certification. It also reached the peak position in Ireland, Norway, and Scotland. Furthermore, it respectively debuted at numbers two and three in Spain and Italy. The album peaked at number four on the Ö3 Austria Top 40 and the Swedish Sverigetopplistan. It also debuted at number four on the Portuguese Albums Chart. The album also reached number six on the Dutch MegaCharts, number seven on the Swiss Music Charts, number eight on the Hungarian MAHASZ, and number three on the Danish Hitlisten and number nine on both the French Albums Chart and the German Media Control Charts. In Belgium, the record respectively peaked at numbers eight and nineteen in Flanders and Wallonia. The album reached number 23 on The Official Finnish Charts, and debuted at number 45 on the Polish ZPAV. In South America, Bangerz charted at number one on the Argentinian CAPIF chart and the Brazilian ABPD chart. The record experienced similar success in Oceania, where it debuted in the peak position of the Australian ARIA Charts and reached number two in New Zealand. In the latter country, it was certified gold.

Impact

Bangerz and its promotional events have been largely credited with establishing a sexually provocative image for Cyrus. Zack O'Malley Greenburg from Forbes noted that her performances, music videos, and public behavior received "plenty of condemnation along with all the attention" in the lead-up to the record; he suggested that this was intentionally done so "[parents will] never again buy any products related to Cyrus–or her former alter-ego, tween sensation Hannah Montana." John Murphy from musicOMH stated that Cyrus' performance at the MTV Video Music Awards became "the seismic event that ensured we'd never recall 2013 without thinking of her", further opining that the anticipation it built for Bangerz made it "impossible not to admire her PR operation."

Andrew Unterberger of Billboard felt that Bangerz developed the maturing image for Cyrus that her third album Can't Be Tamed (2010) failed to accomplish. He suggested that she had "no true backup plan" for creating a new public persona in 2010, and stated that she "now feels firmly in control of her music and her image" in 2013. Marlow Stern from The Daily Beast shared a similar sentiment, stating that Cyrus "is completely in control of what she’s doing" after her recent controversies, which he described as "pure artistic calculation born out of mild desperation", and has successfully done "just about anything to gain our attention". Zack O'Malley Greenburg of Forbes commented that despite widespread criticism of "chasing YouTube views and record sales at the expense of her image", the "new Cyrus" appears "marketable as ever." Writing for Glamour, Mickey Woods compared the promotional "era" for Bangerz to those of Britney Spears' and Christina Aguilera's third and fourth studio albums Britney (2001) and Stripped (2002), respectively, in that "both albums by these legends were wildly experimental", adding that Cyrus' project "will probably be retrospectively deemed iconic, maybe even classic." Mark Jacobs of V likened the album to Control (1986) by Janet Jackson, in that Cyrus was "an artist coming into her own" in a fashion similar to Jackson.

Patrick Ryan of USA Today commented that Cyrus' collaborations with Mike Will Made It contributed to his new-found prominence, stating that Mike Will Made It's position as an executive producer has helped him "[jump] to the forefront as an interesting character [...] in an era where a lot of producers have fallen behind the scenes again". From a commercial standpoint, however, Suzanne Cowie of Babble suggested that Cyrus' opening-week sales figures and subsequent decline supported the idea that the studio album format is reaching its end, having used her example to exemplify that "consumers are only interested in the single". She further opined that they do not "[have] the time to sit and listen through to an album in its entirety", and credited the rise of digital downloads with promoting a less engaging listening process, where consumers "[have not] connected in any way with the band/singer and their hopes for the record."

In December 2013 MTV named Cyrus as their Best Artist of 2013, for which criteria including Bangerzs sales were taken into consideration. James Montgomery from MTV News elaborated on the network's decision that Cyrus "[declared] her independence and [dominated] the pop-culture landscape", adding that "she schooled—and shocked—us all in 2013, and did so on her own terms." In early December 2013, Cyrus was listed in the top ten finalists for Time Person of the Year, the only enterteiner in the list, though she lost to Pope Francis; she was also listed on Barbara Walters' "Most Fascinating People of the Year". Billboard staff called Cyrus the "Most Talked About Pop Star" of 2013, and also recognized the controversial evolution of her career as the "Top Music Moment" of the year, elaborating that she was a "maelstrom that expanded and grazed nearly every aspect of pop culture in 2013." Cyrus was also the most-searched person of the year on Google, with Leah Chernikoff of Elle writing that "most folks, even famous ones, only strike Internet gold like that once in a lifetime (or maybe once a year), but Cyrus hit it again—and again—in 2013."

Track listing
Credits adapted from the liner notes of Bangerz.

Notes
  signifies a co-producer
  signifies a vocal producer
  signifies an additional producer

Sampling credits
 "We Can't Stop" contains a portion of the composition "La Di Da Di", written by Douglas Davis and Ricky Walters.
 "My Darlin'" contains a portion of the composition "Stand by Me", written by Jerry Leiber, Mike Stoller, and Ben E. King.
 "SMS (Bangerz)" contains a portion of the composition "Push It", written by Hurby Azor and Ray Davies.

Credits and personnel
Management

Miley Cyrus – executive producer
Mike Will Made It – executive producer

Vocals

Miley Cyrus – lead vocals, background vocals
Britney Spears – featured vocals
Nelly – rap, featured vocals
Future – rap, featured vocals
Big Sean – rap, featured vocals
French Montana – rap, featured vocals
Ludacris – rap, featured vocals

Production

Miley Cyrus – songwriter
Oren Yoel – songwriter, producer
Mike Will Made It – songwriter, producer
Rock City – songwriter, vocal producer
Doug E. Fresh – songwriter
Slick Rick – songwriter
P-Nasty – songwriter, co-producer
Marz – songwriter, producer
Sean Tallman – recording
Sean Garrett – songwriter
Pharrell Williams – songwriter, producer
Nelly – songwriter
Future – songwriter
Jeremih – songwriter
Jerry Leiber – songwriter
Mike Stoller – songwriter
Ben E. King – songwriter
Tyler Sam Johnson – songwriter, additional producer
Dr. Luke – songwriter, producer, programming
Maaureen AnneMcDonald – songwriter
Stephan Moccio – songwriter
Sacha Skarbek – songwriter
Sven Heidinga – engineer
Big Sean – songwriter
French Montana – songwriter
Rami Samir Afuni – songwriter, producer
Michael McHenry – songwriter, producer
Ryan Buendia – songwriter
Mike Caffrey – engineer
Kyle Edwards – songwriter, producer
Samuel Jean – songwriter
Andrew Colleman – arrangement, recording, digital editing
Jean Baptiste – songwriter
Cameron Ochs – songwriter
Phil Allen – engineer
John Shanks – songwriter
Todd Robinson – recording assistant
Asia Bryant – songwriter
Jacob Dennis – recording assistant
Manny Marroquin – mixing
Chris Galland – mixing assistant
Rene Toledo, Jr. – recording assistant
Delbert Bowers – mixing assistant
Doron Dina – recording assistant
Chris O'Brian – engineering
Chris "Tek" O'Ryan – sound engineering

Instrumentation

Paul Dateh – instrumentation
David Richard Campbell – string arrangement, conductor
Rudy Stein – cello
Steve Richards – cello
Suzie Katayama – cello
Steven Wolf – drum
Dr. Luke – instrumentation
Cirkut – instrumentation
Stephan Moccio – piano
Andrew Duckles – viola
Darrin McCann – viola
Alyssa Park – violin
Charlie Bisharat – violin
Grace Oh – violin
Joel Pargman – violin
John Wittenberg – violin
Kevin Connolly – violin
Sara Parkins – violin
Songa Lee – violin
Chad Hugo – guitar, whistle
Chris Cab – guitar

Credits adapted from Bangerz liner notes.

Charts

Weekly charts

Year-end charts

Decade-end charts

Certifications

Release history

See also
List of number-one albums of 2013 (Australia)
List of number-one albums of 2013 (Canada)
List of UK Albums Chart number ones of the 2010s
List of Billboard 200 number-one albums of 2013

References

2013 albums
Miley Cyrus albums
RCA Records albums
Albums produced by Cirkut
Albums produced by Dr. Luke
Albums produced by Mike Will Made It
Albums produced by Pharrell Williams
Albums produced by Rock City
Albums produced by will.i.am
Albums recorded at Westlake Recording Studios
Contemporary R&B albums by American artists